Danwon-gu is a district of the city of Ansan in Gyeonggi-do, South Korea. The name `Danwon` came from the nickname of Kim Hong Do, a famous Korean artist of the 18th century. The previous name of Kim Hong Do's Hometown was "Ansan", the residents wanted to rename the district so it related with their great artist Kim Hong-do.

Administrative divisions
Danwon-gu is divided into the following dongs:

See also
Sangnok-gu

References

External links
English Website

 
Ansan
Districts in Gyeonggi Province